Çanta (meaning "bag" in Turkish) is a town in Silivri district of Istanbul Province, Turkey, on the European side of the city. It is accessible from the state road  that runs from Istanbul to Edirne, and is home to 4,739 people (2000 census).

Çanta is a newly established, modern settlement while a village with the similar name, Çantaköy, still exists neighboring the town in the north. To differentiate between the both settlements, the village is called "Eski Çanta" (Old Çanta) while the town is sometimes called "Yeni Çanta" (New Çanta). Çanta has three neighborhoods, Fatih, Mimarsinan and Yolçatı.

Population

References

See also
 Çanta Wind Farm

External links

Silivri
Populated places in Istanbul Province